Muhammad Sadiq was a noted artist from 18th century Iran. He was a painter at the court of the Zand ruler Karim Khan (reigned 1750–79). After Karim Khan's death, he worked for the Qajar ruler Agha Mohammad Khan Qajar (reigned 1779–97).

Portrait of Rustam Khan 

One of Sadiq's famous paintings is a portrait of Mohammad Rustam Khan Zand, a Zand prince and grandson of the military commander Zaki Khan. The painting is often praised for its classical Persian depiction of Male Masculinity.

Gallery

References

External links

18th-century Iranian painters
People of the Zand dynasty